Bakovnik is a former settlement in the Municipality of Kamnik in central Slovenia. It is now part of the town of Kamnik. The area is part of the traditional region of Upper Carniola. The municipality is now included in the Central Slovenia Statistical Region.

Geography
Bakovnik lies south of Kamnik, between Duplica and Perovo, above the right bank of the Kamnik Bistrica River.

History
Bakovnik was annexed by Kamnik in 1934, ending its existence as an independent settlement. Bakovnik quickly urbanized after its annexation and lost its original agricultural character.

References

External links

Bakovnik on Geopedia

Populated places in the Municipality of Kamnik
Former settlements in Slovenia